Brendan Eugene Sexton III (born February 21, 1980) is an American actor.

Life and career
Born in Staten Island, New York, Sexton made his film debut in Todd Solondz's Welcome to the Dollhouse playing the troubled bully Brandon McCarthy, for which he was nominated for an Independent Spirit Award. He was the lead in Hurricane Streets and Desert Blue and also appeared in Boys Don't Cry, Black Hawk Down, and Just Like the Son, as well as the cult films Empire Records and Pecker.

He also starred in The Marconi Bros. alongside Dan Fogler and in Jonathan Blitstein's Let Them Chirp Awhile alongside Justin Rice.

Sexton owns and operates a New York City-based independent record label Big Bit of Beauty.

In a radio interview, in 2002, Sexton said that the version of the film Black Hawk Down, in which he briefly appeared, which made it onto theater screens was significantly different from the one recounted in the original script. According to him, many scenes asking hard questions of the U.S. troops with regard to the violent realities of war, the true purpose of their mission in Somalia, etc., were cut out.

Sexton has said in interviews that speaking out against the film led to him getting "blacklisted" and prevented him from getting work in major films.

Filmography

Film

Television

References

External links

1980 births
Male actors from New York City
American male child actors
American male film actors
American music industry executives
American male television actors
Living people
People from Staten Island